Brigadier Sir Francis Smith Reid CBE, RA (1900–1970) was a senior officer in the British Army during the Second World War and the following years.  He was the second Commander of the Ceylon Army from 1952 to 1955. His other commands included Commander, Ceylon Garrison and UK troops in Ceylon (1949–50), Cyprus District (1950–51) and Cyrenacia District (1951–52).

Reid was secretary to the Speaker of the House  of Commons. He lived at Berden Hall and is buried in the churchyard of St Nicholas' Church, Berden, Essex.

References

External links
Former Army commanders
Scottish Names

1900 births
1970 deaths
Commanders of the Order of the British Empire
British Army personnel of World War II
Sri Lankan brigadiers
People from Bearsden
Royal Artillery officers
Commanders of the Sri Lanka Army